Liolaemus nitidus (shining tree iguana) is a species of lizard in the family Iguanidae.
It is endemic to Chile, notably within the Chilean matorral ecoregion.

A medium-sized species, reaching 9 cm snout-to-vent, up to 27 cm including the long tail. It is oviparous, and juvenile specimens usually feed on insects, though adults tend to have a more omnivorous diet.

References

 C. Michael Hogan & World Wildlife Fund. 2013. Chilean matorral. ed. M.McGinley. Encyclopedia of Earth. National Council for Science and the Environment. Washington DC

nitidus
Lizards of South America
Endemic fauna of Chile
Reptiles of Chile
Chilean Matorral
Reptiles described in 1834
Taxa named by Arend Friedrich August Wiegmann
Taxonomy articles created by Polbot